Irapada (English: Redemption) is a 2006 Nigerian supernatural thriller film, produced and directed by Kunle Afolayan. In 2007 It won the Africa Movie Academy Award for Best Film in an African Language. It was also featured as one of the Must See African Films of the 21st century on CNN African Voices in 2013. It was released on DVD in July 2008.

References

Films directed by Kunle Afolayan
Yoruba-language films
2006 films
Films produced by Kunle Afolayan
Nigerian thriller films